David Philip Perkins (born 21 June 1982) is a former English professional footballer who played as a midfielder who is currently first-team and U23s coach at Exeter City.

Career

Morecambe
Perkins started his career with Morecambe, for whom he played 170 league games.

Rochdale
In 2007, he moved to League Two side Rochdale. On 17 May 2008 he scored a deflected goal from 30 yards which put Rochdale level on aggregate with Darlington in a semi-final play-off, during which he was later shown a red card. Rochdale went through on penalties. Rochdale appealed to his red card which was rejected by the FA, meaning he missed the League Two play-off final against Stockport County at Wembley Stadium and also the first four games of the 2008–09 season.

Colchester United
Perkins signed for Colchester United on 8 July 2008 for an undisclosed six-figure fee, citing the potential of another promotion push as the leading reason for his move to the U's.

Chesterfield
On 2 October 2009 Perkins signed on loan for Chesterfield.

Stockport County
On 18 January 2010 he signed on loan for Stockport on a deal until the end of the season.

Return to Colchester
After becoming an outcast in the U's squad under Aidy Boothroyd his career at the club looked bleak until John Ward was appointed as new boss in May 2010. After regaining his first team place and making over 40 appearances Perkins was being scouted by a number of Championship clubs. At the end of the season with Colchester he won four awards: Player of the Year; Player's Player of the Year; CUSA (Colchester United Supporters' Association) Home Player of the Year and CUSA Away Player of the Year. Teammate Anthony Wordsworth said of Perkins, "He was simply amazing this season".

Barnsley
On 7 June 2011, he rejected the opportunity to extend his deal at Colchester United and subsequently signed for Championship side Barnsley; signing a 2-year contract with the Tykes. He had previously worked with ex Barnsley manager Keith Hill at Rochdale. He made his debut on 6 August 2011, in a 0–0 draw against Nottingham Forest. On 9 April 2012 he scored his first goal for Barnsley, coming in a 1–1 draw away to Blackpool. The goal was described as a "face volley" by football correspondent Conor Breen.

His bright blonde hair, similar to that of London Mayor Boris Johnson's, led to Charlton Athletic supporters nicknaming him 'Barnsley Boris' after Barnsley's visit to The Valley in October 2012.

Due to his consistently solid performances throughout the season in midfield, he received the Supporters' Player of the Year Award for the 2012–13 Season.

The energetic midfielder penned an extension to his contract in August, 2012, keeping him at the club until at least the summer of 2014.

Blackpool
On 17 January 2014, Perkins signed an 18-month deal with Blackpool on a free transfer. He was released in May 2015.

Wigan Athletic
On 20 May 2015, Perkins signed a one-year deal with newly relegated side Wigan Athletic after his release from Blackpool.

David Perkins scored his only goal and most memorable in his career whilst playing for Wigan against his former team Blackpool, scoring the 3rd goal in a 3–1 victory.

Wigan entered into contract talks with him at the end of the 2017–18 season.

Return to Rochdale 
On 24 May 2018, it was announced that Perkins had signed a new two-year deal with Rochdale, which would be effective from July 1, moving from Wigan Athletic where he spent 3 years. It is Perkins' second spell at the club, after a season long stay in the 2007–08 season.

Speaking about the move, Perkins said "I've had a good three years at Wigan. We got promoted during my first year, relegated during my second and then promoted this season. I've had some great times there and I've enjoyed every minute of it. The fans have been unbelievable with me, all the staff and the Chairman, so I can't thank them enough."

Tranmere Rovers
On 5 January 2019, Perkins joined Tranmere Rovers on an 18-month contract from Rochdale.

AFC Fylde
On 16 August 2020, Perkins signed for AFC Fylde.He was released on  21st of May 2022.

Bamber Bridge
On 2 August 2022, Perkins signed for Bamber Bridge.

Coaching Career
On 10 November 2022, Perkins was appointed first team coach and Under 23s manager at Exeter City.

Career statistics

Honours
Wigan Athletic
EFL League One: 2015-16 2017–18

Tranmere Rovers
EFL League Two play-offs: 2019

References

External links

1982 births
Living people
People from Heysham
Sportspeople from Lancashire
English footballers
England semi-pro international footballers
Association football midfielders
Morecambe F.C. players
Rochdale A.F.C. players
Stockport County F.C. players
Chesterfield F.C. players
Colchester United F.C. players
Barnsley F.C. players
Blackpool F.C. players
Wigan Athletic F.C. players
Tranmere Rovers F.C. players
AFC Fylde players
Bamber Bridge F.C. players
English Football League players
National League (English football) players
Northern Premier League players
Association football coaches
Exeter City F.C. non-playing staff